Mónica Soraia Amaral Mendes (born 16 June 1993) is a Portuguese football defender currently playing for A.C. Milan Women in the Serie A.

Club career
Mendes has played in her native Portugal for S.U. 1º Dezembro before moving to the United States, where she played in college for the University of Texas at Brownsville and in the USL W-League for the reserve teams of D.C. United / Washington Spirit.

In August 2015, she played the 2015–16 UEFA Women's Champions League qualifying round for Cyprus club Apollon Limassol. During the same month, shortly after the end of Apollon's Champions League campaign, Mendes was playing for Vålerenga Fotball in the Norwegian Toppserien.

In February 2016, she signed with FC Neunkirch of the Swiss Nationalliga A.

International career
Mendes has played for both Portugal women's national football team (senior) and the under-19 team.

Honours
1º Dezembro
Winner
 Campeonato Nacional de Futebol Feminino (3): 2009–10, 2010–11, 2011–12

References

External links
 

1993 births
Living people
Sportspeople from Almada
Portuguese women's footballers
Portugal women's international footballers
College women's soccer players in the United States
Expatriate women's footballers in Cyprus
Expatriate women's footballers in Norway
Expatriate women's footballers in Switzerland
Expatriate women's footballers in Italy
Toppserien players
Apollon Ladies F.C. players
Vålerenga Fotball Damer players
FC Neunkirch players
A.C.F. Brescia Calcio Femminile players
Women's association football defenders
A.C. Milan Women players
S.U. 1º Dezembro (women) players
Campeonato Nacional de Futebol Feminino players
UEFA Women's Euro 2017 players
Portuguese expatriate women's footballers
Portuguese expatriate sportspeople in the United States
Portuguese expatriate sportspeople in Norway
Portuguese expatriate sportspeople in Italy
Portuguese expatriate sportspeople in Cyprus
Portuguese expatriate sportspeople in Switzerland